TMK 2100 is a tramcar vehicle produced by Croatian companies Končar and TŽV Gredelj, between 1994 and 2003, using parts from TMK 201. The prototype was made in 1994, and serial production began in 1997. 16 trams have been ordered and delivered for the City of Zagreb.

Construction of steel frame, brake equipment, motor cooling, steel construction of control desk and other auxiliary devices for 16 tram sets, were produced by the TŽV Gredelj (Rolling Stock Factory).

Technical

Technical data:
system: 600 V, DC
continuous output: 240 kW
max. speed: 
wheel arrangement: Bo′-2′-2′-Bo′
gauge: 
min. curve radius: 
overall length: 
width: 
floor height: 
seated passengers: 45
standees: 119 (4 pass/m2)

See also
 TMK 2200

References

External links 

TMK Trams
Tram vehicles of Croatia